Stevia is a sweetener and sugar substitute made from the leaves of the plant species Stevia rebaudiana.

Stevia may also refer to:

 Stevia rebaudiana, the plant species used for making stevia sweeteners
 Stevia (genus), the genus of about 240 species of herbs and shrubs that includes Stevia rebaudiana

Rivers in Romania
 Ștevia River (Mânăileasa)
 Ștevia River (Azuga)
 Ștevia River (Rudăreasa)
 Ștevia River (Râușor)

See also